Jahmal Banks (born October 2, 2001) is an American football wide receiver for the Wake Forest Demon Deacons.

High school career 
Banks attended Saint Frances Academy in Baltimore, Maryland. A three-star recruit, Banks committed to Wake Forest University to play college football.

College career 
Banks played sparingly in his first two seasons, recording seven receptions for 115 yards.

The following season, Banks scored his first career touchdown in the season opener against VMI. Banks would go on to score two touchdowns against Liberty, and record a career-high 141 receiving yards against Clemson. He would then score three total touchdowns against Boston College and Louisville. During the 2022 Gasparilla Bowl, Banks recorded three receptions for 72 yards, and a touchdown. He finished the season with 42 receptions for 636 yards and nine touchdowns.

College statistics

References

External links 
 Wake Forest Demon Deacons bio

Living people
2001 births
Wake Forest Demon Deacons football players
American football wide receivers
Players of American football from Washington, D.C.
African-American players of American football